The 2006–07 season was Birmingham City Football Club's 104th consecutive season played in the English football league system, their 46th in the second tier of English football, and their first season at that level under the name of the Football League Championship. Managed by Steve Bruce, Birmingham were promoted back to the Premier League after just one season in the Championship. They reached the fourth round of both the 2006–07 FA Cup and League Cup. The 2006–07 season also marked the 100th anniversary of the first match held at their St Andrew's stadium.

Gary McSheffrey was top scorer with 16 goals, of which 13 were scored in the league.

Pre-season

Pre-season friendlies

Season review
Birmingham returned straight back to the Premier League by finishing second in The Championship thereby gaining automatic promotion. The team had started the season inconsistently leaving them in ninth position after the 0–1 defeat to Norwich City on 17 November. This led to supporters calling for the sacking of manager Steve Bruce, but the board held firm and the team pulled themselves around. The year finished with Birmingham topping the table by nine points after dropping only seven points in 15 games since the defeat against Norwich.

Boxing Day saw the centenary of the opening of St Andrew's. Queens Park Rangers were the team to visit on the historic day, and Birmingham marked the occasion by defeating their rivals 2–1. Many fans also hoped that the 'curse of the gypsies' would finally be dispelled from the stadium, and at last the team could make their mark on English football.

The FA Cup saw Birmingham overturn Newcastle United away from home that was undoubtedly the result of the season. Goals from Gary McSheffrey, Bruno Ngotty, Sebastian Larsson, DJ Campbell, and an own goal by former Aston Villa midfielder Nolberto Solano gave Birmingham a 5–1 victory at St James' Park. Blues went on to lose in the next round to Reading.

Birmingham once again returned to some inconsistent form, but a run of good results after the Easter games against Burnley and Barnsley saw them climb back to the top of the table with one game to go, and after Crystal Palace beat Derby County, promotion was secured. The only thing left to be sorted out was who would win the league, Birmingham or Sunderland? Blues had a one-point lead, but after a defeat to Preston North End and a victory for Sunderland, Blues were confined to finishing second. But promotion back to the big time was secured.

The end of season awards ceremony, held at the Hilton Birmingham Metropole Hotel, saw Stephen Clemence win the player of the season and players' player of the season awards. Fabrice Muamba was chosen young player of the season, and Krystian Pearce was the Academy player of the season. Sebastian Larsson's goal against Sheffield Wednesday on 28 April was chosen goal of the season, and the breakthrough award, sponsored by the local radio station, went to goalkeeper Colin Doyle, whose penalty save against Wolverhampton Wanderers in April earned him the "magic moment" award.
The season ended with the club recording the most league wins (26) in a season.

The Championship

Match details

League table (part)

Results summary

FA Cup

Birmingham reached the fourth round of the 2006–07 FA Cup before losing to Reading of the Premier League.

League Cup

Birmingham reached the fourth round of the 2006–07 League Cup before losing to Liverpool of the Premier League.

Transfers

In

 Brackets round club names indicate the player's contract with that club had expired before he joined Birmingham.

Loan in

Out

 Brackets round club names denote the player joined that club after his Birmingham City contract expired.

Loan out

Appearances and goals

Numbers in parentheses denote appearances as substitute.
Players with squad numbers struck through and marked  left the club during the playing season.
Players with names in italics and marked * were on loan from another club for the whole of their season with Birmingham.

a. Soccerbase's stats for the match between Derby County and Birmingham City on 9 March 2007 omit substitute appearances by Jerome and Johnson.

References
General
 
 
 Source for match dates, league positions and results: 
 Source for lineups, appearances, goalscorers and attendances: Matthews (2010), Complete Record, pp. 448–49.
 Source for goal times: 
 Source for transfers: 

Specific

2006-07
Birmingham City